The women's shot put event at the 2018 African Championships in Athletics was held on 5 August in Asaba, Nigeria.

Results

References

2018 African Championships in Athletics
Shot put at the African Championships in Athletics